Carol of Zhenguan is a Chinese historical television series directed by Wu Ziniu. It was first aired on CCTV-1 in China in 2007. The series is based on the events in the Zhenguan era of the reign of Emperor Taizong during the Tang dynasty.

Plot
In 626 during the Tang dynasty, Li Shimin, the Prince of Qin, assassinated two of his brothers, Li Jiancheng, the Crown Prince, and Li Yuanji, the Prince of Qi, in a palace coup historically known as the Xuanwu Gate Incident. Two months later, he ascended the throne in Chang'an and changed the era name to "Zhenguan" to mark the start of his reign. Shortly after he became emperor, Li Shimin had to deal with the threat posed by the aggressive Tujue in the north while consolidating power and solidifying his control over the Tang Empire. Under Li Shimin's rule, China flourished in various aspects and the Zhenguan era is considered one of the golden ages in Chinese history.

Cast

Imperial family
 Tang Guoqiang as Li Shimin
 Zhang Lanlan as Princess Ankang
 Nie Yuan as Li Ke
 Wan Hongjie as Li Chengqian
 Han Zaifen as Empress Zhangsun
 Wang Donghui as Li Tai
 Wen Hao as Li You
 Ma Yuke as Li Zhi
 Xi Yuli as Consort Yang

Tang imperial court
 Du Zhiguo as Hou Junji
 Cao Peichang as Zhangsun Wuji
 Wang Huichun as Cen Wenben
 Zhang Tielin as Luo Yi
 Chen Baoguo as Du Ruhui
 Liu Yubin as Fang Xuanling
 Dong Ziwu as Wei Zheng
 Sun Feihu as Feng Deyi
 Bi Haifeng as Li Jing
 Zhang Shan as Li Ji
 Zhang Naiwen as Chang He
 Li Qingxiang as Zhangsun Shunde
 Si Yuan as Ma Zhou
 Mou Fengbin as Chu Suiliang
 Hu Qingshi as Zhang Xuansu
 Bai Dezhang as Xiao Yu
 Wang Jiahe as Dugu Mou
 Wang Baojiang as Chai Zhewei
 Wang Zhengjia as Cheng Huailiang
 Zhang Xiqian as Zheng Renji
 Liu Haibo as Quan Wanji
 Zhang Hongming as Zhao Shida
 Chen Ganlin as Zhao Yuankai

Tujue
 Tu Men as Jieli Khan
 Hong Yuzhou as Tuli Khan
 Liu Haitao as Shiluodie
 Li Peng as Yinan
 Zhou Guangzhen as Zhishisili
 Menghewuliji as Ashina Simo
 Qinaritu as Qibiheli

Others
 Tan Feiling as Dou Yi
 Qi Xiaoxiao as Zheng Liwan

Fictional characters
 Bai Qinglin as Ashina Yun
 Tiffany Tang as Caiji
 Rao Minli as Haitang
 Zong Fengyan as Min Guoqi
 Gao Chengsheng as Zhao Gongcun
 Liu Sha as Lüxiu
 Yan Jiansheng as Ma Xuanliang
 Zhu Hongjia as Chang Sheng
 Wu Qiang as Chi Deli
 Xu Jingyi as Dou Fu
 Zhang Danfeng as Mu Yikuan
 Ma Dong as Cui Xian
 Yang Hongtao as Wang De
 Guo Yongzhen as Botie
 Zhang Hao as Fan Xing
 Yu Yang as Henglian
 Sun Jie as Yuqing
 Deng Na as Ling'er

Critical reception
On 28 January 2007, one day after Carol of Zhenguan premiered on CCTV-1, many negative comments about the drama surfaced on the internet, ranging from the inaccuracies with the costumes and filming locations to inconsistencies with historical sources. On the same day, director Wu Ziniu responded in an interview that he believed that the negative comments were unfounded and intentionally created to reduce ratings because Carol of Zhenguan was competing for viewership with other similar television series such as The Rise of the Tang Empire. Wu said, "(This is) an 82 episodes long television series, I suggest audiences watch first before commenting."

Some points raised by netizens include:
 The costumes did not resemble the style of dress of any period in Chinese history, and the architecture of the palace resembled that of the Han dynasty rather than the Tang dynasty. Wu Ziniu replied that he had sought advice from experts on the Tang dynasty for the costumes and props, and his consultants included the president of the Chinese Tang Dynasty History Research Association and seven history professors from Peking, Renmin and Beijing Normal universities.
 Tang Guoqiang (then 53), who portrayed Li Shimin, was too old for his role because historically the emperor was 29 when he came to the throne. Others pointed out that Zhang Tielin's character Luo Yi was too overbearing and too similar to Zhang's better known portrayal of the Qianlong Emperor in My Fair Princess. Wu Ziniu responded that the age problem had been automatically "corrected" when Li Shimin's eldest son, Li Chengqian (who historically was a child when his father became emperor), was portrayed by Wan Hongjie as a man in his early 20s. Wu Ziniu also replied that since Luo Yi was a rebel general, it would not be unexpected of him to behave arrogantly.
 Even though Carol of Zhenguan was marketed as a historical television series, it was very similar to other costume dramas centring on themes of political intrigues and power struggles, and this could be misleading to audiences. Wu Ziniu felt that this comment was ridiculous because only two episodes of Carol of Zhenguan had been aired at the time, so viewers would not have seen the "politics" parts yet. Wu admitted that Carol of Zhenguan does have themes of war, action, conspiracy, romance, etc. that are present in many other television series, but the political intrigues in Carol of Zhenguan are "artistic recreations" based on history, so this makes the drama worth watching.
 Only one line about Princess Ankang (portrayed by Zhang Lanlan) was recorded in historical texts. Volume 83 of the New Book of Tang stated, "Princess Ankang, married Dugu Mou." However, the princess plays a very important role in Carol of Zhenguan. Wu Ziniu mentioned that he chose her from Li Shimin's many children because she was representative of princesses of the Zhenguan era. He also stated that he did not pick Princess Gaoyang, a better known daughter of Li Shimin, because audiences are already quite familiar with her because of her illicit affair with the monk Bianji.
 Empress Zhangsun (portrayed by Han Zaifen) was described in historical texts as a virtuous and wise woman who played a supportive role to her husband. However, in Carol of Zhenguan, she is depicted as a jealous and petty wife, and a mother who overindulges her son, Li Chengqian. Audiences find this hard to accept. Screenwriter Zhou Zhifang replied that he wanted Empress Zhangsun to be more realistic since it is natural for a wife to feel jealous when her husband loves another woman, and for a mother to unknowingly spoil her son when she showers too much care on him.

See also
 The Rise of the Tang Empire

References

External links
  Carol of Zhenguan on Sina.com
  Carol of Zhenguan on xinhuanet.com

2007 Chinese television series debuts
Television series set in the Tang dynasty
Mandarin-language television shows
Chinese historical television series
China Central Television original programming
Cultural depictions of Emperor Taizong of Tang